Blake Elliott (born February 19, 1981)
was the winner of the 2003 Gagliardi Trophy for academic and football excellence covering all of NCAA Division III. He graduated from Melrose High School in Melrose, Minnesota and Saint John's University (Collegeville, Minnesota). He owns several school, conference, and national records in NCAA football. In his senior year, he led Saint John's to the NCAA Division III Football Championship over previously unbeaten Mount Union College. After college, Elliott spent time with the Minnesota Vikings with a tryout. He never played professionally.

References

External links
MIAC Profiles of Excellence, Saint John’s Blake Elliott
The Star Tribune

1981 births
Living people
American football wide receivers
Saint John's Johnnies football players
People from Melrose, Minnesota
Players of American football from Minnesota